Powszechna Kasa Oszczędności Bank Polski Spółka Akcyjna (also known as PKO Bank Polski S.A., PKO BP S.A.)  is Poland's largest bank founded in 1919. It provides services to individual and business clients. The core business activity of PKO Bank Polski is retail banking. The full Polish name roughly translates to "General Savings Bank". Popularly, only the acronym "PKO" is used by clients. 

With 1,145 branches located in Poland and abroad and a market capitalization of PLN 52 billion (EUR 12.6 billion equivalent) as of 2018, PKO BP Group is among the largest financial institutions in Poland and is also one of the largest financial groups in Central and Eastern Europe.

History
On February 7, 1919, by the order of the Head of State Józef Piłsudski, the Postal Savings Bank was created. Its first director was appointed on December 28, 1919, Hubert Linde. For many years during the Second Polish Republic, Henryk Gruber was the president of the PKO. With time, a bank's head office was established in Warsaw with headquarters at ul. Świętokrzyska 31/33 and the first local branches: in Kraków, Lwów, Łódź, Poznań and Katowice. The first goal of the PKO was to introduce the Polish zloty into circulation instead of the Polish mark (as a derivative of the German mark). From 1920, the bank had a legal personality as a state institution. The employees of the funds were associated in the Association of Postal Savers Workers, which had their own wheels at larger branches, e.g. in Warsaw, in Łódź.

During the German occupation of Poland, in the Second World War, Bank Polski operated under German management.

In 1945, the cash register activity was resumed. On January 1, 1950, the Postal Savings Fund was liquidated, and its agencies were taken over by the General Savings Bank. In 1974, the PKO offer was enriched with a savings and settlement account for natural persons (commonly known as ROR).

From 1975 to 1987, the PKO branches operated within the structures of the National Bank of Poland, retaining their identity.
On November 1, 1987, PKO Bank Polski became an independent bank again, as part of the economic reforms implemented by the communist government of Poland in its last years.

In 2019, they were announced the title sponsor for the Polish Ekstraklasa.

Operations
Today (as at the end of 2015) PKO Bank Polski employs around 29,000 people and has a full-year net profit of over 7 billion PLN (more than 2 billion US dollars). Its assets are worth more than 285 billion PLN (around 80 billion US dollars). Bank was ranked 510 in the Forbes Global 2000 for year 2010. The bank is also present outside Poland, notably in Ukraine after the acquisition of KredoBank (Кредобанк). The company is headquartered in central Warsaw.

Because of its size and position as one of the first banks, PKO Bank Polski is still one of the best recognized and most valuable brands in Poland. Specialists from The Banker magazine estimated the value of Bank's brand at US$1 billion and in Rzeczpospolita "Polish Brands 2010" ranking its value was set at PLN 3.6 billion. In the 2011 edition of ranking "The BrandFinance® Banking 500" prepared by the British firm Brand Finance, which includes the most valuable bank brands in the world, PKO Bank Polski brand was valued at US$1.480 billion. It gives PKO Bank Polski the 1st place in Poland and Central and Eastern Europe and 114th place in the world.

Ownership
PKO Bank Polski is listed on the Warsaw Stock Exchange. As of 3Q 2020, the state directly and indirectly holds 31.39% of shares (29.43% belong to the State Treasury of Poland and 1.96% to state-owned Bank Gospodarstwa Krajowego).

Financial data

Capital Group
PKO Bank Polski is the leader of the Capital Group. In addition to the parent, the group structure includes wholly owned and majority-owned subsidiaries and associates. These pursue their own business objectives whilst supporting the Bank's sales objectives and acting as its service providers. The subsidiary companies also complement the Bank's offer with such services as leasing, settlement of electronic card transactions, factoring and investment fund management.

Companies in PKO Bank Polski Capital Group - Direct subsidiaries:
 PKO Towarzystwo Funduszy Inwestycyjnych SA (investment fund management, Warsaw)
 PKO BP Bankowy Powszechne Towarzystwo Emerytalne SA (pension fund management, Warsaw)
 PKO Leasing SA (leasing services, Łódź)
 PJSC KredoBank (financial services, Lviv, Ukraine)
 Inter-Risk Ukraina Sp. z o.o. (debt collection services, Kyiv, Ukraine)
 Finansowa Kompania "Prywatne Inwestycje" Sp. z o.o. (factoring, Kyiv, Ukraine)
 PKO Życie Towarzystwo Ubezpieczeń SA (insurance services, Warsaw)
 PKO Finance AB (financial services, Stockholm, Sweden)
 Bankowe Towarzystwo Kapitałowe SA (services, Warsaw)
 PKO BP Finat Sp. z o.o. (intermediary financial services, Warsaw)
 Qualia Development Sp. z o.o. 3 (real estate development, Warsaw)
 Centrum Haffnera Sp. z o.o. (property management subsidiaries, Sopot)
 Merkury – fiz an (invest the funds collected from participants in the fund, Warsaw)

Presidents

See also
Economy of Poland
Warsaw Stock Exchange
WIG30

References

External links

  

Banks of Poland
Companies based in Warsaw
Companies listed on the Warsaw Stock Exchange
Polish brands
Postal savings system